This article contains a sortable table listing all major lakes of Switzerland. The table includes all still water bodies, natural or artificial, that have a surface area of at least , regardless of water volume, maximum depth or other metric. These lakes are ranked by area, the table including also the elevation above sea level and maximum depth. They are either natural (type N), natural but used as reservoirs (NR) or fully artificial (A). For a list of artificial lakes only, see List of dams and reservoirs in Switzerland. For a list of lakes above  that includes smaller water bodies, see List of mountain lakes of Switzerland.

Lakes, large and small, can be found in almost all cantons and provide an important source of water as well as leisure opportunities. The two most extensive, Lake Geneva and Lake Constance, are amongst the largest in Europe and mark the border of the Swiss Plateau, along with the Alps and the Jura Mountains. The largest wholly Swiss lake is Lake Neuchâtel. All these lakes are found in the four major river basins of Switzerland: Rhine, Rhone, Po and Danube, at almost all elevations below the permanent snow line.

Distribution 
There are several thousand lakes in Switzerland, with estimations up to 7000, although those include very small water bodies, traditionally referred to as "lakes". On this list, only the 103 largest lakes, which are over 30 hectares in area, are included. Among these, 58 are over 1.0 km2, 17 are over 10 km2, and just five are over 100 km2 in area. Of these lakes, 37 are natural, 21 are natural, but are used as reservoirs, and 45 are manmade reservoirs. These 103 lakes are shared among 21 cantons, out of the 26. Some of these lakes are also shared with neighboring France, Germany, Austria, and Italy (for simplicity purposes, only the total area of the lake is indicated). Four of the cantons (Grisons, Berne, Valais, and Ticino) have more than 10 of the lakes, apiece, and just over one-half of the cantons (14) have one or more lakes of over 100 km2 in area. Most of these lakes are either below 800 metres above sea level (mostly natural lakes), or above 1600 metres (mostly manmade lakes). A large majority of the lakes, 66, are located in the Rhine basin (partly via the Aare River); 17 in the Rhone basin (partly via the Doubs River); 14 in the Po River basin (mostly via the Ticino River); and six are in the Danube River basin (all via the Inn River).

Main list 

* Types: N = natural; NR = natural but used as reservoirs; A = fully artificial

See also 

 Hydrology of Switzerland
 List of rivers of Switzerland
 List of glaciers of Switzerland
 List of islands of Switzerland
 Fishing industry in Switzerland
 :Category:Lakes of Switzerland by canton
 Italian Lakes – group of lakes on the Italian border

Notes

References

External links 

Lakes, MySwitzerland.com

Switzerland

Lakes

pl:Szwajcaria#Jeziora